Biraghi is an Italian surname. Notable people with the surname include:

Cristiano Biraghi (born 1992), Italian footballer
Guglielmo Biraghi (1927–2001), Italian film critic and festival director
Luigi Biraghi (1801–1879), Italian Roman Catholic priest

Italian-language surnames